The Bing Crosby Stakes is an American Thoroughbred horse race held annually at Del Mar Racetrack in Del Mar, California. The Grade 1 race is open to horses three years of age and up. It is run on Dirt at a distance of six furlong and presently offers a purse of $301,500.

The race is named for entertainer Bing Crosby, a founding partner of Del Mar Racetrack and a racehorse owner and breeder.

Records

Handicap record 
 Lord Nelson – 1:07.65 (2016)

Most wins by a jockey:
 6 - Flavien Prat (2015, 2016, 2017, 2018, 2020, 2021)

Most wins by a trainer:'''
 4 – Bob Baffert (1992, 2009, 2011, 2016)
 4 – Bruce Headley (1998, 2000, 2001, 2008)

Winners

*1946: Dead Heat

Del Mar Racetrack
Horse races in California
Graded stakes races in the United States
Open sprint category horse races
Grade 1 stakes races in the United States
Recurring sporting events established in 1946
Breeders' Cup Challenge series
1946 establishments in California
Bing Crosby